Yüksel Koptagel (born 27 October 1931) is a Turkish composer and pianist. She was born in Istanbul, Turkey, granddaughter of General Osman Nuri Koptagel, a commander in the Turkish War of Independence. Her maternal great grandfather Abdul Karim Khan Tareen, a physician, had migrated from Multan, British India (now Pakistan) and had settled in Istanbul, adopting the name Abdul Karim Bey.

Koptagel studied music with the composer and conductor Cemal Resit Rey and later with Alexander Tansman, José Cubiles, Tony Aubin, Joaquin Rodrigo, and Lazare Levy in Paris and Madrid. After completing her studies, Koptagel took a position with the Istanbul State Symphony Orchestra and worked as a pianist and composer.
She is considered to be the owner of the first classical guitar works composed in Turkey.

In the 1960s (during the regime of Ayub Khan Tareen (no relation)) she visited Multan to trace her maternal roots and met the descendants of siblings of Abdul Karim Tareen.

Works
Selected works include:
Quand nous nous sommes séparés (André Viaud after George Gordon Noel Byron, Lord Byron)
Pastorale for piano
Impression de Minorque for piano
Epitafio de un muchacho muerto en abril for piano
Toccata for piano
Fossil Suite (Suite im alten Stil) for piano or guitar
Tamzara (Türkischer Tanz) for guitar

References

1931 births
Living people
20th-century classical composers
Women classical composers
Turkish composers
20th-century women composers